Christopher or Chris Cox may refer to:

Entertainers
Chris Cox (DJ), American musician
Chris Cox (magician) (born 1984), British magician
Chris Cox (voice actor), American voice actor
 Christopher Cox, British orchestra conductor of the London Shostakovich Orchestra

Politicians
Christopher Cox (born 1952), American politician, chairman of the Securities and Exchange Commission, 2005–2009
Christopher Christian Cox (1816–1882), American politician from Maryland
Christopher Nixon Cox (born 1979), candidate for Congress in New York's First Congressional District

Sportsmen
Chris Cox (racing driver), in 2009 New Zealand Grand Prix
Chris Cox (soccer), on All-time Long Island Rough Riders roster
Christopher Cox (cricketer) (born 1962), Zimbabwean cricketer
Chris Cox (horse trainer), natural horsemanship practitioner and clinician

Others
Chris Cox (manager) (born 1982), Chief Product Officer at Meta Platforms
Chris W. Cox, former chief lobbyist for the United States National Rifle Association
Christopher Cox (writer) (1949–1990), writer, member of The Violet Quill
Christopher Augustus Cox (1889–1959), British soldier

See also
Christopher Cock, London instrument maker
Christopher Cocks (17th century), see List of Ambassadors of the Kingdom of England to Russia
Christina Cox (born 1971), Canadian actress and stuntwoman